Molly: Do Yourself a Favour is the soundtrack to the two-part Australian miniseries Molly, which screened on the Seven Network in February 2016. The miniseries tells the story of Ian "Molly" Meldrum, an Australian music critic, journalist, record producer and musical entrepreneur.

The soundtrack features some of Meldrum's record productions, including Russell Morris' "The Real Thing", the Ferrets' "Don't Fall in Love" and Supernaut's "I Like It Both Ways", as well as contributions from close personal friends Elton John, Lynne Randell and Kylie Minogue and songs that recall classic Countdown moments, which Meldrum hosted from 1975 to 1987.

The physical edition features three CDs, with the first two discs including songs featured in the miniseries. The third disc includes tracks handpicked by Meldrum.

Critical reception
Paul Cashmere of Noise11 said; "The songs featured in the soundtrack are not just the soundtrack to a mini-series, they capture the musical landscape of Australia across the 60s, 70s and 80s. These songs were the popular music Australian's were hearing daily on radio and became the soundtrack to many lives."

Cameron Adams from the Herald Sun gave the album 4 out of 5 stars, asking readers "How do you distil all the music lived and loved by Molly Meldrum? It's taken 60 tracks to even scratch the surface" before calling Molly a "legend".

A staff writer at The Music said that the album is "the best thing since [compilation] Ripper '76".

Track listing
CD 1
 "Evie (Part 1)" – Stevie Wright
 "The Real Thing" – Russell Morris
 "C'mon We're Taking Over" – Hush
 "I Remember When I Was Young" – Matt Taylor
 "Most People I Know (Think That I'm Crazy)" – Billy Thorpe and the Aztecs
 "Devil Gate Drive" – Suzi Quatro
 "Living in the 70's" – Skyhooks
 "You Just Like Me 'Cos I'm Good in Bed" – Skyhooks
 "Yesterday's Hero" – John Paul Young
 "Summer Love" – Sherbet
 "It's Almost Summer" – Billy Thorpe
 "Only One You" – Sherbet
 "Turn Up Your Radio" – The Masters Apprentices
 "The Ballroom Blitz" – Sweet
 "Girls on the Avenue" – Richard Clapton
 "Don't Fall in Love" – The Ferrets
 "Ego Is Not a Dirty Word" – Skyhooks
 "I Like It Both Ways" – Supernaut
 "Howzat" – Sherbet
 "Matter of Time" – Sherbet

CD 2
 "Cheap Wine" – Cold Chisel
 "Party to End All Parties" – Skyhooks
 "I Was Made for Lovin' You" – Kiss
 "Please Don't Go" – KC and the Sunshine Band
 "My Turn to Cry" – Cold Chisel
 "One Way or Another" – Blondie
 "I See Red" – Split Enz
 "Modern Girl" – James Freud & The Radio Stars
 "Ciao Baby" – Lynne Randell
 "The Nips Are Getting Bigger" – Mental as Anything
 "Antmusic" – Adam and the Ants
 "Planet Earth" – Duran Duran
 "Counting the Beat" – The Swingers
 "Beautiful People" – Australian Crawl
 "Hot in the City" – Billy Idol
 "Kiss the Bride" – Elton John
 "Out of Mind, Out of Sight" – Models
 "Pleasure & Pain" – The Divinyls
 "Take On Me" – A-ha
 "Too Many Times" – Mental as Anything

CD 3
 "Walk Like an Egyptian" – The Bangles
 "Cant Stop the Music" – The Village People
 "That's the Way (I Like It)" – KC and the Sunshine Band
 "Karma Chameleon" – Culture Club
 "Rio" – Duran Duran
 "Friday on My Mind" – The Easybeats
 "Sweet Dreams (Are Made of This)" – Eurythmics
 "I Don't Like Mondays" – The Boomtown Rats
 "Girls Just Want to Have Fun" – Cyndi Lauper
 "Go West" – Pet Shop Boys
 "Wake Me Up Before You Go-Go" – Wham!
 "The Loco-Motion" – Kylie Minogue
 "Rock Lobster" – The B-52's
 "Bony Maronie" – Hush
 "One Night in Bangkok" – Murray Head
 "Brass in Pocket" – The Pretenders
 "Down Under" – Men at Work
 "April Sun in Cuba" – Dragon
 "Sorrento Moon (I Remember)" – Tina Arena
 "Your Song" – Elton John

Charts and certifications

Weekly charts

Year-end charts

Decade-end charts

Certifications

Release history

See also
 List of number-one albums of 2016 (Australia)

References

2015 soundtrack albums
2016 in Australia